The Wynants Kill is a  stream which has its source at Glass Lake near Averill Park, New York, and terminates at the Hudson River at Troy, New York.

The stream is named after Wijnant Gerritsen van der Poel (1617–1699), a Dutch cabinet maker from Meppel who owned a sawmill on it in the 1650s, while kill is from an archaic Dutch word for "stream".

Tributaries
 Horse Heaven Brook
 Glass Lake
 Crooked Lake
 Crystal Lake
 Burden Lake

See also
 List of rivers of New York

References

Further reading 
 

Rivers of Rensselaer County, New York
Rivers of New York (state)
Tributaries of the Hudson River